Mahjong Tiles refers to:
 Mahjong tiles, the tiles used to play Mahjong games.
 Mahjong Tiles, a block of 44 Unicode characters representing the tiles used in Mahjong games in print text.